Edgar Federico Mason Villalobos (1953 – 28 November 1996) was a Mexican columnist, economist, and journalist.

Biography 
Born in 1953, Mason studied the career of Economics at the National Autonomous University of Mexico School of Economics. Obtained his title in 1983. In addition to performing his occupation and being a professor of Economics at the Panamerican University, the Intercontinental University, and the Monterrey Institute of Technology and Higher Education (ITESM), he dedicated himself to economic and political analyses, and journalism. He was a columnist in the Mexican newspapers El Financiero, Novedades de México, El Norte, and El Informador, as well as in La Nación, i.e. the monthly official magazine of the National Action Party (PAN); the Mexican weekly magazine Impacto, and the U.S. magazines Background and Weekly Review.

Published books 
He was the author of more than fifteen books, including: Luz y sombra del Tratado de Libre Comercio, México y sus mexicanos: Una explicación sobre la idiosincrasia mexicana, La otra crisis que viene, México: crisis y supercrisis.
(Light and shadow of the Free Trade Agreement, Mexico and its Mexicans: an explanation about Mexican idiosyncrasy, The other crisis that is coming, Mexico: crisis and supercrisis.)

Award 
"Negobank" Economics Award, in 1976.

Death 
On 28 November 1996, columnist Mason was killed by a firearm shot, in his residence of Senda Encantadora #24, Fraccionamiento Real de Montecassino, in Huitzilac (north of Cuernavaca), State of Morelos. A press release from the Attorney General of the State of Morelos (Procuraduria General de Justicia del Estado de Morelos, PGJEM), said that according to the first investigations, the cause of the crime was the theft of goods. Days later, the Inter American Press Association (SIP) sent a letter to the then governor of the State of Morelos, Jorge Carrillo Olea, in which they requested an investigation about the causes of the journalist's murder.

See also 
List of journalists killed in Mexico

References 

Mexican columnists
Assassinated Mexican journalists
Deaths by firearm in Mexico
National Autonomous University of Mexico alumni
1953 births
1996 deaths
20th-century Mexican male writers
Mexican journalists
20th-century non-fiction writers
People murdered in Mexico
20th-century Mexican writers
1996 murders in Mexico